Urland may refer to:

 Urland, archaic spelling of Aurland in the county of Sogn og Fjordane, Norway
 Urland, a fictional kingdom in the 1981 film Dragonslayer
 Urland (performance collective), a performance collective based in the Netherlands